The Red and the Blue (Il Rosso e il Blu) is an Italian stop motion animated television series for children. It has two clay animated characters, antagonistic shapeshifters, one colored red, the other blue.

The show sets the two characters in an undifferentiated white plane in which they interact. They are able to assume various forms at will, for example in one episode The Blue becomes a boat while The Red becomes an island, later the Blue becomes a suitcase while The Red partially converts his body into a chest-of-drawers, filling the suitcase with red 'clothes'.

Misseri's website describes the situation as:
Two blocks of clay. The Red is big and passionate; he like driving fast cars, eating... enjoying all the pleasures of life. The blue is small, smart and cunning, and he's there just to bother the red.

The characters communicate in a prelingual form that conveys emotions without using any particular language. This avoided the need for translation or subtitles.
Francesco Misseri describes the language "non-verbal" and "onomatopoeic" on the website and in a comment on YouTube.

The series was written and directed by Francesco Misseri with music by Piero Barbetti. In Australia it was first broadcast on the ABC.  In the United States, it first aired in 1976 on Captain Kangaroo on CBS.

Episodes

1976 series 
The Car
The Little Plant
The Gun
The Suitcase
The Opera
The Slot-Machine
The Umbrella
The Imitator

2005 series 
The Policeman
The Tap

Popular culture 
The Red and The Blue lookalike characters appears in one Play-Doh commercial in Australia back in 1997, except the colours for the characters were changed as Green and Red.

References

External links
 Misseri Studio's YouTube Channel

1976 Italian television series debuts
1970s animated television series
1970s children's television series
Clay animation television series
Italian children's animated television series
Stop-motion animated television series
Television series about shapeshifting
Animated television series without speech